Delta County, U.S.A. is a 1977 American made-for-television drama film directed by Glenn Jordan and starring Peter Donat, Jeff Conaway, Robert Hays, Joanna Miles, Lola Albright, Peter Masterson, Michele Carey and Morgan Brittany. The film originally served as a pilot for a proposed prime time television soap opera that never materialized. It was broadcast as The ABC Friday Night Movie on May 20, 1977.

Synopsis
Delta County is a staid Southern community caught between the old traditions and a rapidly changing way of life. For teenagers Terry Nicholas, his sister McCain, and Joe Ed, the boy from the wrong side of the tracks that she's attracted to, the old traditions have little meaning in their lives. Their elders, struggling to preserve values of an older day, have personal problems that are sometimes overwhelming, such as the one facing John McCain Jr. an alcoholic whose wife Kate is having a hidden and torrid romance that sets her husband off on a vengeance-seeking spree.

Cast
Peter Donat as John McCain Jr.
Jeff Conaway as Terry Nicholas
Robert Hays as Bo
Joanna Miles as Kate McCain Nicholas
Lola Albright as Dossie Wilson
Jim Antonio as Jack the Bear
Peter Masterson as Billy Wingate
Doney Oatman as McCain Nicholas
Joe Penny as Joe Ed
Tisch Raye as Robbie Jean
Morgan Brittany as Doris Ann
Sandy McPeak as Chief Doughly
Michele Carey as Jonsie Wilson

References

External links

1977 television films
1977 films
1977 drama films
1970s English-language films
Films set in Texas
Films directed by Glenn Jordan
Films scored by Jack Elliott
Paramount Pictures films
ABC network original films
Television films as pilots
Television pilots not picked up as a series
American drama television films
1970s American films